The Black Opera: Symphoniæ Mysteriorum in Laudem Tenebrarum is the third studio album by Italian symphonic black metal band Opera IX, released in 2000 through Avantgarde Music. In this album, Opera IX drops some of their doom metal influences, heading to a more gothic-influenced instrumentation. This would also be the last album by Opera IX to feature Cadaveria on vocals and Flegias/Marcello Santos on drums; they would leave the band in the following year.

The album is styled in the way of an opera, divided in six acts. It also contains a bonus track, unrelated to the album's concept, a cover of Bauhaus' "Bela Lugosi's Dead".

The album's subtitle is Latin for "Symphony in praise of the mysteries of the shadows".

Track listing

Personnel
Opera IX
 Cadaveria (Raffaella Rivarolo) — vocals
 Ossian D'Ambrosio — guitars
 Vlad — bass
 Flegias, a.k.a. Marcello Santos (Alberto Gaggiotti) — drums
 Lunaris — keyboards

2000 albums
Opera IX albums
Avantgarde Music albums